Marti Anderson may refer to:
 Marti Anderson (politician) (born 1951), American politician 
 Marti Anderson (statistician), New Zealand academic

See also
 Martin Anderson (disambiguation)